ISOC is an abbreviation which may refer to:

 Information Security Operations Center, is a location where enterprise information systems are monitored, assessed, and defended.
 Internet Society, ISOC, an international organization that promotes Internet use and access
 Internal Security Operations Command, a unit of the Thai military devoted to national security issues
 Islamic Society, various Islamic-based groups
 Independent State of Croatia, a country that existed during WWII